West Broad Street Historic District is a national historic district located at Darlington, Darlington County, South Carolina.  The district encompasses 36 contributing buildings in a primarily residential section of Darlington. They were constructed between about 1890 and 1928. Most of the residences are grand in scale and reflect the prosperity of the individuals who built them. Several of the houses were owned by some of Darlington's most prominent citizens. Most of the residences are large, two-story frame Victorian or Queen Anne structures with decorative woodwork. The dwellings are set on deep lots that are planted with large trees and shrubs. A number of these large residences are similar in appearance and were built by master carpenter Lawrence Reese. Also included in the district are 13 modest, one-story frame houses with a few decorative features, as well as two imposing brick bungalows.

It was listed on the National Register of Historic Places in 1988.

References

Houses on the National Register of Historic Places in South Carolina
Historic districts on the National Register of Historic Places in South Carolina
Queen Anne architecture in South Carolina
Victorian architecture in South Carolina
Historic districts in Darlington County, South Carolina
National Register of Historic Places in Darlington County, South Carolina
Darlington, South Carolina
Houses in Darlington County, South Carolina